In classical logic, a hypothetical syllogism is a valid argument form, a syllogism with a conditional statement for one or both of its premises.

An example in English:
If I do not wake up, then I cannot go to work.
If I cannot go to work, then I will not get paid.
Therefore, if I do not wake up, then I will not get paid.

The term originated with Theophrastus.

A pure hypothetical syllogism is a syllogism in which both premises and conclusions are conditionals. The antecedent of one premise must match the consequent of the other for the conditional to be valid. Consequently, conditionals contain remained antecedent as antecedent and remained consequent as consequent.

If p, then q.
If q, then r. 
∴ If p, then r.
A mixed hypothetical syllogism consists of one conditional statement and one statement that expresses either affirmation or denial with either the antecedent or consequence of that conditional. Therefore, such a mixed hypothetical syllogism has four possible forms, of which two are valid, while the other two are invalid(See Table). The first way to get a valid conclusion is to affirm the antecedent. A valid hypothetical syllogism either denies the consequent (modus tollens) or affirms the antecedent (modus ponens).

Propositional logic
In propositional logic, hypothetical syllogism is the name of a valid rule of inference (often abbreviated HS and sometimes also called the chain argument, chain rule, or the principle of transitivity of implication). The rule may be stated:

where the rule is that whenever instances of "", and "" appear on lines of a proof, "" can be placed on a subsequent line.

Hypothetical syllogism is closely related and similar to disjunctive syllogism, in that it is also a type of syllogism, and also the name of a rule of inference.

Applicability 
The rule of hypothetical syllogism holds in classical logic, intuitionistic logic, most systems of relevance logic, and many other systems of logic. However, it does not hold in all logics, including, for example, non-monotonic logic, probabilistic logic and default logic. The reason for this is that these logics describe defeasible reasoning, and conditionals that appear in real-world contexts typically allow for exceptions, default assumptions, ceteris paribus conditions, or just simple uncertainty.

An example, derived from Ernest W. Adams, 
 If Jones wins the election, Smith will retire after the election.
 If Smith dies before the election, Jones will win the election. 
 If Smith dies before the election, Smith will retire after the election.

Clearly, (3) does not follow from (1) and (2). (1) is true by default, but fails to hold in the exceptional circumstances of Smith dying. In practice, real-world conditionals always tend to involve default assumptions or contexts, and it may be infeasible or even impossible to specify all the exceptional circumstances in which they might fail to be true. For similar reasons, the rule of hypothetical syllogism does not hold for counterfactual conditionals.

Formal notation 
The hypothetical syllogism inference rule may be written in sequent notation, which amounts to a specialization of the cut rule:

 

and expressed as a truth-functional tautology or theorem of propositional logic:

Proof

Alternative forms
An alternative form of hypothetical syllogism, more useful for classical propositional calculus systems with implication and negation (i.e. without the conjunction symbol), is the following:

(HS1) 

Yet another form is: 

(HS2)

Proof
An example of the proofs of these theorems in such systems is given below.  We use two of the three axioms used in one of the popular systems described by Jan Łukasiewicz.
The proofs relies on two out of the three axioms of this system:
(A1) 
(A2) 

The proof of the (HS1) is as follows:
(1)        (instance of (A1))
(2)        (instance of (A2))
(3)        (from (1) and (2) by modus ponens)
(4)        (instance of (A2))
(5)        (from (3) and (4) by modus ponens)
(6)        (instance of (A1))
(7)  (from (5) and (6) by modus ponens)

The proof of the (HS2) is given here.

As a metatheorem
(1)         (instance of the theorem proved above)
(2)         (instance of (T1))
(3)         (from (1) and (2) by modus ponens)
(4)         (instance of (T2))
(5)         (from (3) and (4) by modus ponens)

See also
Modus ponens
Modus tollens
Affirming the consequent
Denying the antecedent
Transitive relation

References

External links 
Philosophy Index: Hypothetical Syllogism

Rules of inference
Theorems in propositional logic
Classical logic
Syllogism